Linum catharticum, also known as purging flax, or fairy flax, is an herbaceous flowering plant in the family Linaceae, native to Great Britain, Iceland, central Europe and Western Asia. It is an annual plant and blooms in July and August.

It is a known host of the pathogenic fungus flax rust (Melampsora lini).

References

catharticum
Flora of Western Asia
Flora of Europe
Plants described in 1753
Taxa named by Carl Linnaeus